Riswold is a surname. Notable people with the surname include:

Gilbert Riswold (1882–1938), American sculptor
Jim Riswold (born 1957), American advertising executive